Francesco de' Marini (1630–1700) was a Roman Catholic prelate who served as Titular Archbishop of Teodosia (1676–1700), Titular Archbishop of Amasea (1671–1676), Bishop of Molfetta (1666–1670), and Bishop of Albenga (1655–1666).

Biography
Francesco de' Marini was born in Genoa, Italy in 1630.
On 2 August 1655, he was appointed by Pope Alexander VII as Bishop of Albenga.
On 8 August 1655, he was consecrated bishop by Federico Sforza, Cardinal-Deacon of Santi Vito, Modesto e Crescenzia, with Giacinto Cordella, Bishop of Venafro, and Louis de Fortia-Montréal, Bishop of Cavaillon, serving as co-consecrators. 
On 29 March 1666, he was appointed by Pope Alexander VII as Bishop of Molfetta where he served until his resignation on 6 Oct 1670.
On 19 January 1671, he was appointed by Pope Clement X as Titular Archbishop of Amasea.
On 27 April 1676, he was appointed by Pope Clement X as Titular Archbishop of Teodosia.
He served as Titular Archbishop of Teodosia until his death in 1700.

Episcopal succession
While bishop, he was the principal co-consecrator of:

References

External links and additional sources
 (for Chronology of Bishops) 
 (for Chronology of Bishops) 
 (for Chronology of Bishops) 
 (for Chronology of Bishops) 
 (for Chronology of Bishops) 
 (for Chronology of Bishops) 
 (for Chronology of Bishops) 
 (for Chronology of Bishops) 

17th-century Italian Roman Catholic titular archbishops
Bishops appointed by Pope Alexander VII
Bishops appointed by Pope Clement X
Bishops of Molfetta
1630 births
1700 deaths